The Campeonato Mineiro Segunda Divisão  is the third tier of football league of the state of Minas Gerais, Brazil.

List of champions

Primeira Divisão

Terceira Divisão

Segunda Divisão

Notes

FC Betinense changed their name to CA Serranense and moved from Betim to Nova Serrana.

Titles by team 

Teams in bold still active.

By city

External links
 FMF official website

References

 
Mineiro